Ohlone Wilderness is a  regional park in the United States that is part of the East Bay Regional Parks (EBRPD) system. It is located in southern Alameda County, near the cities of Fremont, California and Sunol, California.  It is located between Mission Peak (to its west) and Sunol Regional Wilderness (to its east).

Access

The wilderness can be traversed only on foot or on horseback. EBRPD states that trail bicycles and motor vehicles are not allowed.

The Ohlone Wilderness Trail passes through two areas that belong to the San Francisco Water Department. Trail users are warned that they must remain within the trail boundaries in these areas. Otherwise, they may be cited and fined for trespassing on SFWD property and potentially jeopardize public use of the corridors.

History
For generations, the land had been inhabited by Chochenyo language Ohlone-speaking Taunans. The first white settlers, Patrick and Mary Ann Geary, started a homestead here in the 1860s. In 1895, their son, Maurice Geary, built the house and barn that later became the Interpretive Offices and the Green Barn Visitors Center. The property was acquired by Willis Brinker in 1939.

References

External links
 Ohlone Wilderness—at the East Bay Regional Parks official site

East Bay Regional Park District
Parks in Alameda County, California